The Column of Marcus Aurelius is a Roman victory column in Piazza Colonna, Rome, Italy. It is a Doric column featuring a spiral relief: it was built in honour of Roman emperor Marcus Aurelius and modeled on Trajan's Column.

Construction 
Because the original dedicatory inscription has been destroyed, it is not known whether it was built during the  emperor's reign (on the occasion of the triumph over the Marcomanni, Quadi and Sarmatians in the year 176) or after his death in 180; however, an inscription found in the vicinity attests that the column was completed by 193.

In terms of the topography of ancient Rome, the column stood on the north part of the Campus Martius, in the centre of a square.  This square was either between the temple of Hadrian (probably the Hadrianeum) and the temple of Marcus Aurelius (dedicated by his son Commodus, of which nothing now remains – it was probably on the site of Palazzo Wedekind), or within the latter's sacred precinct, of which nothing remains.  Nearby is the site where the emperor's cremation occurred.  

The column consists of 27 or 28 blocks of Carrara marble, each of  diameter, hollowed out while still at the quarry for a stairway of 190–200 steps within the column up to a platform at the top.  Just as with Trajan's Column, this stairway is illuminated through narrow slits into the relief.

Relief 

The spiral picture relief tells the story of Marcus Aurelius' Danubian or Marcomannic wars, waged by him from 166 to his death.  The story begins with the army crossing the river Danube, probably at Carnuntum.  A Victory separates the accounts of two expeditions.  The exact chronology of the events is disputed; however, the latest theory states that the expeditions against the Marcomanni and Quadi in the years 172 and 173 are in the lower half and the successes of the emperor over the Sarmatians in the years 174 and 175 in the upper half.  

One particular episode portrayed is historically attested in Roman propaganda – the so-called "rain miracle in the territory of the Quadi", in which a god, answering a prayer from the emperor, rescues Roman troops by a terrible storm, a miracle later claimed by the Christians for the Christian God.

In spite of many similarities to Trajan's Column, the style is entirely different, a forerunner of the dramatic style of the 3rd century and closely related to the triumphal arch of Septimius Severus, erected soon after.  The figures' heads are disproportionately large so that the viewer can better interpret their facial expressions. The images are carved less finely than at Trajan's Column, through drilling holes more deeply into the stone, so that they stand out better in a contrast of light and dark.  As villages are burned down, women and children are captured and displaced, men are killed, the emotion, despair, and suffering of the "barbarians" in the war, are represented acutely in single scenes and in the figures' facial expressions and gestures, whilst the emperor is represented as protagonist, in control of his environment.    

The symbolic language is altogether clearer and more expressive, if clumsier at first sight, and leaves a wholly different impression on the viewer to the whole artistic style of 100 to 150 as on Trajan's Column.  There, cool and sober balance – here, drama and empathy.  The pictorial language is unambiguous – imperial dominance and authority is emphasised, and its leadership is justified.  Overall, it is an anticipation of the development of artistic style into late antiquity, and a first artistic expression of the crisis of the Roman empire that would worsen in the 3rd century.

Later history 
In the Middle Ages, climbing the column was so popular that the right to charge the entrance fee was annually auctioned, but it is no longer possible to do so today. Now the Column serves a centrepiece to the Piazza Colonna, in front of the Palazzo Chigi.

Restoration 
About three metres of the base have been below ground level since 1589 when, by order of pope Sixtus V, the whole column was restored by Domenico Fontana and adapted to the ground level of that time. Also a bronze statue of the apostle St. Paul was placed on the top platform, to go with that of St. Peter on Trajan's Column (27 October 1588). (Originally the top platform had a statue of Marcus Aurelius, but it was removed and switched with St.Paul after Christianity took reign as the dominant religion.) That adaptation also removed the damaged or destroyed original reliefs on the base of garland-carrying victories and (on the side facing the via Flaminia ) representations of subjected barbarians, replacing them with the following inscription mistakenly calling this the column of Antoninus Pius, which is now recognised as lost:

Dimensions 
Height of base: 
+ Height of shaft: 
Typical height of drums: 
Diameter of shaft: 
+ Height of capital: 
= Height of column proper:  (~ 100 Roman feet)
+ Height of pedestal: ~ 
= Height of top of column above ground: ~

See also 

List of ancient spiral stairs
Ancient Roman architecture

References

Bibliography

External links 
Eugen Petersen's photographs of the Column of Marcus Aurelius
High-resolution 360° Panoramas and Images of Column of Marcus Aurelius | Art Atlas

Buildings and structures completed in the 2nd century
Monumental columns in Rome
2nd-century Roman sculptures
Marcus Aurelius
Cultural depictions of Marcus Aurelius
Rome R. III Colonna
Roman sculpture portraits of emperors